Uppsala Student Union (Uppsala studentkår) is one of four students' unions at Uppsala University in Uppsala, Sweden.

According to Swedish law, university students are no longer required to be members of a students' union since 2010.  Uppsala Student Union covers the Disciplinary Domain of Humanities and Social Sciences and the Faculty of Medicine at Uppsala University with the exception of students seated at the University's Gotland campus.

Uppsala Student Union was founded in March 1849 by the student nations at the university and was the first Swedish students' union. The students' union appoints student representatives to various boards and committees of the university.

Uppsala Student Union is a member of the Swedish National Union of Students.

See also
Education in Sweden
Pharmaceutical Students Association, Uppsala

External links
Uppsala Student Union - Official site

Uppsala University
Students' unions in Sweden
1849 establishments in Sweden
Student organizations established in 1849